The Owen Estate is a home located at 3901 S. Gilpin St. in Cherry Hills Village, Colorado. It was built in the early 1920s on five acres of landscaped grounds in Tudor Revival style.

The property includes a "mansion, a complex gatehouse consisting of a gardener's shed/tank house connected by a brick entry arch to an adjacent water tower, a sizable chicken house, and a small coal shed. The property is predominantly bordered by a wood fence constructed of massive timbers, along with a brick
wall along a portion of Gilpin St."

See also
National Register of Historic Places listings in Arapahoe County, Colorado

References

External links 
 

Houses in Arapahoe County, Colorado
Historic districts on the National Register of Historic Places in Colorado
National Register of Historic Places in Arapahoe County, Colorado
Tudor Revival architecture in Colorado
Houses completed in 1923
1923 establishments in Colorado